Elpídio Pereira Silva Filho (born 19 July 1975), known as Silva, is a Brazilian retired footballer who played as a striker.

He spent most of his career in Portugal, mainly representing Boavista and amassing Primeira Liga totals of 187 matches and 62 goals over eight seasons.

Other than in his country, Silva also competed professionally in Japan, South Korea and Cyprus.

Club career
Born in Campina Grande, Paraíba, Silva started his professional career with Clube Atlético Mineiro but quickly moved overseas, joining J1 League club Kashiwa Reysol. After just one season he signed with Portugal's S.C. Braga, where he remained for two seasons.

Silva's most productive period, however, was lived with fellow Primeira Liga side Boavista FC, where he was instrumental in the 2001 league conquest (their only) by scoring in the decisive 3–0 home win against C.D. Aves in the last matchday.

In the subsequent edition of the UEFA Champions League, Silva scored in a 1–1 draw at Liverpool, also finding the net in the second match between the two teams, with the same result. In Boavista's UEFA Cup semi-final run the following campaign, he labelled Celtic a "one-man team" prior to the sides' meeting in the competition's semifinals; the Scots won it 2–1 on aggregate, with Henrik Larsson – the "one man" of Silva's tirade – scoring the decisive goal in Porto.

A move to Sporting CP ensued but, barred by newly signed compatriot Liédson, Silva received few opportunities to shine, although he did net six league goals in his debut season, also being loaned to Vitória S.C. in between.

Released by the Lisbon club in January 2006, Silva subsequently represented Derby County, where he did not appear due to fitness problems, Sport Club Corinthians Alagoano, Suwon Samsung Bluewings and Alki Larnaca FC. In January 2009, he moved to AEK Larnaca FC also in the Cypriot First Division.

Club statistics

References

External links

1975 births
Living people
Brazilian footballers
Association football forwards
Campeonato Brasileiro Série A players
Clube Atlético Mineiro players
Sport Club Corinthians Alagoano players
J1 League players
Kashiwa Reysol players
Primeira Liga players
S.C. Braga players
Boavista F.C. players
Sporting CP footballers
Vitória S.C. players
K League 1 players
Suwon Samsung Bluewings players
Derby County F.C. players
Cypriot First Division players
Alki Larnaca FC players
AEK Larnaca FC players
Brazilian expatriate footballers
Expatriate footballers in Japan
Expatriate footballers in Portugal
Expatriate footballers in England
Expatriate footballers in South Korea
Expatriate footballers in Cyprus
Brazilian expatriate sportspeople in Japan
Brazilian expatriate sportspeople in Portugal
Brazilian expatriate sportspeople in England
Brazilian expatriate sportspeople in South Korea
Brazilian expatriate sportspeople in Cyprus
Sportspeople from Paraíba